This is a list of footballers who have played for SC Freiburg since the promotion to the 2. Fußball-Bundesliga in 1978.

Appearances are for first-team competitive matches only; Substitute appearances included. Statistics correct as of 25 July 2019.''

List

SC Freiburg
Freiburg, Sc
Association football player non-biographical articles